Ranadeep Moitra (born 23 April 1968) is an Indian former cricketer. He played five first-class matches for Bengal between 1986 and 1993.

See also
 List of Bengal cricketers

References

External links
 

1968 births
Living people
Indian cricketers
Bengal cricketers
Cricketers from Kolkata